Badakhshan is a historic region comprising parts of what is now northeastern Afghanistan, eastern Tajikistan, and the Tashkurgan county in China.

Badakhshan may also refer to:

 Badakhshan Province, Afghanistan
 Badakhshan University
 Gorno-Badakhshan Autonomous Region, Tajikistan

See also 
 Badakhshani (disambiguation)